Anders Karl Daniel Eldebrink (born 11 December 1960) is a Swedish former ice hockey defenceman who played in the SEL in the 1970s and 1980s.  He also played 165 games for the Swedish national team.

Playing career
Eldebrink began his career at age 16 in 1976 in the Swedish Elite League.  Playing  for Södertälje SK, he was named player of the year in 1985 and MVP in 1988 and 1989.  They won the league championship in 1985.  Later he played in Switzerland for EHC Kloten, winning the league championship in 1993, 1994, and 1995.  He also played two NHL seasons with the Vancouver Canucks and Quebec Nordiques.

Internationally, he was on the 1984 and 1987 Swedish Canada Cup teams, which made the final in 1984; the IIHF World Championships gold medal team in 1987; and the Olympic Bronze medal team in 1988.  He was named to the World Championship all-star team in 1989.

On 14 April 2014 it was announced that he had been appointed to the Swedish Hockey Hall of Fame.

Coaching career
After his playing career, Eldebrink became Sports Manager of the Södertälje SK team in 1998.

When Vladimir Yurzinov was released as the coach of EHC Kloten in October 2004, Anders Eldebrink became the new coach for the Flyers. His assistant coach is his former teammate Felix Hollenstein.

During the 2012–13 Elitserien season, Eldebrink replaced Per-Erik Johnsson as head coach of AIK IF.

Personal
He is the younger brother of the former athlete Kenth Eldebrink and cousin of former ice hockey defenceman Robert Nordmark.

Career statistics

Regular season and playoffs

International

References

External links

1960 births
Fredericton Express players
Ice hockey players at the 1988 Winter Olympics
EHC Kloten players
Living people
Olympic bronze medalists for Sweden
Olympic ice hockey players of Sweden
Olympic medalists in ice hockey
People from Kalix Municipality
Quebec Nordiques players
Södertälje SK players
Swedish ice hockey defencemen
Undrafted National Hockey League players
Vancouver Canucks players
Medalists at the 1988 Winter Olympics
Sportspeople from Norrbotten County